Ivan Dodig was the defending champion but chose not to defend his title.

Daniil Medvedev won the title after defeating Joris De Loore 6–3, 6–3 in the final.

Seeds

Draw

Finals

Top half

Bottom half

References
Main Draw
Qualifying Draw

Trophée des Alpilles - Singles
2016 Trophée des Alpilles - Singles